Heramyia populicola is a species of ulidiid or picture-winged fly in the genus Heramyia of the family Ulidiidae.

References

Ulidiidae